RHS Britain in Bloom is the largest horticultural campaign in the United Kingdom. It was first held in 1963, initiated by the British Tourist Board based on the example set by Fleurissement de France (now Conseil national de villes et villages fleuris), which since 1959 has promoted the annual Concours des villes et villages fleuris. It has been organised by the Royal Horticultural Society (RHS) since 2002.

The competition is entered by the communities of towns, villages and cities. Different categories exist for various sizes of settlements. Groups are assessed for their achievements in three core pillars: Horticultural Excellence; Environmental Responsibility; and Community Participation.

Over 1,600 communities around the UK enter each year, participating in their local region's "in Bloom" campaign. From these regional competitions, roughly 80 communities are selected to enter the national Finals of RHS Britain in Bloom.

It is a popular campaign, estimated to involve more than 200,000 volunteers in cleaning up and greening up their local area.

Since 2002, the awards have been based on the Royal Horticultural Society's medal standards of Gold, Silver Gilt, Silver and Bronze; the winner is the settlement judged to have most successfully met the rigorous judging criteria. Judging at the regional stage takes place around June/ July; judging for the national stage takes place in August. The results for the UK Finals are announced in September/ October. The competition covers the UK, the Channel Islands and the Isle of Man.

Floral displays play an important part in the contest, but the "Bloom" title is now, perhaps, misleading: in recent years the competition has increasingly assessed how all sectors of the local community are managing their local environment.

In 2006, the RHS introduced the Neighbourhood Awards (now the It's Your Neighbourhood campaign), a grassroots sister campaign to Bloom, supporting smaller, volunteer-led community groups focused on improving their immediate environment.

History
The history of the 'Bloom', as it is colloquially referred to, began in 1963 when Roy Hay MBE, a horticultural journalist, went on holiday to France during the Fleurissement de France and was enthralled by seeing the country "filled to overflowing with flowers, shrubs and trees all in full bloom". His enquiries revealed that President de Gaulle had given orders to brighten up the country and the French Tourist Authority had set up the Fleurissement de France in 1959 (now called Concours des villes et villages fleuris). Hay was so impressed that he approached the British Tourist Authority (BTA), and he and Len Lickorish, then Director General of the BTA, set up a committee to run a British version, "Britain in Bloom".  It was piloted by the British Tourist Authority in 1963 (Lewisham being part of that pilot), and went national in 1964.

Many organisations were invited to help, including: The Automobile Association; London Tourist Board; National Farmers' Union; London Parks; Institute of Parks and Recreation Administration; National Association of Rural Communities; Royal Horticultural Society; Royal Automobile Club; The Tourist Boards of England, Scotland and Wales; The National Federation of Women's Institutes; Civic Trust; Keep Britain Tidy Group; the Flowers and Plants Council; The Horticultural Trades Association; The British Hotels and Restaurants Association; The Society of Town Clerks; Townswomen's Guild and British Airways. Despite this impressive list, Roy Hay later reflected that the initial reaction of the horticultural trade and local authorities was lukewarm.

Nevertheless, regional committees were quickly formed, and in 1964 Bath became the first national winner. From 1964 to 1969 inclusive there was an overall national winner. From 1970, however, the competition was divided up into a range of categories, because of the difficulty of comparing settlements of different sizes fairly.

The British Tourist Authority managed the competition until 1983 when the Government Department sponsoring the BTA felt that it should relinquish the responsibility. The Tidy Britain Group (the group responsible for the Keep Britain Tidy campaign, now known as EnCams) took over; it already had a long association with the competition. To mark the changeover, 1983 was celebrated as "Beautiful Britain in Bloom Year". Sir Lawrie Barratt of Barratt Developments expressed his support to the Tidy Britain Group for the competition and provided sponsorship until 1989.

More categories and awards were added, in part reflecting a greater range of settlements, but also to recognise other elements of horticulture, including landscaping, and also to recognise the strenuous efforts to beautify the urban areas of the larger cities. McDonald's began sponsoring the competition from 1990, which led to focus on littering behaviour and the implementation of a Children's Painting Competition Calendar. In 2001, the event was organised jointly by EnCams and the Royal Horticultural Society, and from November 2001 the RHS took full control as the organising body of Britain in Bloom.

Structure

The competition currently has twelve entry categories, most of which are determined by population size. Within each category, similarly sized communities compete across a spectrum of horticultural endeavour, community participation and environmental responsibility, which includes dealing with issues of litter, graffiti and vandalism.

Category A
Small Village
Village
Large Village
Category B
Small Town
Town
Large Town
Category C
Small City
City
Large City
Category D
Urban Community
Category E
Small Coastal (electoral roll up to 12K)
Large Coastal (electoral roll over 12K)

Judging
RHS Britain in Bloom encompasses 18 Regions/ Nations (12 English regions, as well as Scotland, Wales, Northern Ireland, Isle of Man, Jersey and Guernsey).

Judging takes place over two years in two stages:

Regional competition: Entries are first submitted by voluntary local 'Bloom' Committees, depending upon the area, to Local Authorities, Town or Parish Councils. These communities take part in their regional competition, for example South West in Bloom. The local volunteers are colloquially known as "bloomers". Judging takes place in June/July, and winners are announced during local presentations between August and November.

UK-wide: After the judging of the regional stage, Committees representing their nation/region select entrants for the second UK-wide stage. To ensure that effort is sustained over time, this second stage of judging takes place in August the year after they qualify. Winners of the UK judging are announced at a prestigious ceremony in September/October.

National winners

2020 to 2022

2010 to 2019

2000 to 2009

1964 to 1999

Details to 1990 from Graham Ashworth CBE, Britain in Bloom, The Tidy Britain Group (Wigan:1991)

Subsequent competitions
From the winners and finalists of RHS Britain in Bloom, entries are picked to represent Britain in international competitions such as the Entente Florale.

Discretionary awards
(Definition Source)
(Definition Source)

The Britain in Bloom Horticulture Award (from 2012)  / previously The Britain in Bloom Floral Award / The Asmer Trophy: Presented to the finalist that demonstrates the best horticultural displays throughout the entry.
The Environment Award  (from 2014) / previously The Sustainable Landscaping Award (from 2010) / previously The Permanent Landscaping Award / Beautiful Britain Award(from 1983)/Landscape Development Trophy(to 1983): Presented to the finalist that demonstrates innovative and high quality sustainable landscaping practices within their entry.  (Sustainable landscaping referring to creating an attractive environment that is in balance with the local climate and requires minimal resource input.)
The Community Award (from 2002) : Presented to the finalist deemed to have best demonstrated that community involvement in their local "in Bloom" campaign is representative of all sectors of the community.
 Community Champion Award / previously The Bob Hare Award(from 1980 to 1990) : Presented to individuals who demonstrate exceptional commitment and dedication to the Britain in Bloom cause in their community.
Commercial Award / Gordon Ford Trophy: Presented to the finalist that demonstrates the best environmental and/or horticultural contribution from business / retail / corporate interests. Originally presented by Gordon Ford. 
Pride of Place Award(from 2012) / previously Environmental Quality Award / Tidy Britain Group Trophy / Keep Britain Tidy Trophy / The Keep Britain Tidy Award: Presented to the finalist that best demonstrates duty and commitment to any one or more of the following: cleanliness, effective use of resources and maintenance of hard landscaping and street furniture.
Tourism Award: Presented to the finalist that demonstrates the most effective use of their local "in Bloom" initiatives as a means of encouraging and supporting tourism in their area.
Best Public Park Award: Given in Memory of David Welch. Presented to the park (including publicly run pay-on-entry parks and gardens) designed for horticultural excellence, giving delight to the visitor through appropriate planting, high standards of maintenance, including infrastructure, conserving wildlife, cleanliness and features of interest.
Conservation and Wildlife Award / previously The Going for Green Trophy: Presented to the finalist that best demonstrates commitment to sustainable development, including management of the flora and fauna in their local environment.
Outstanding Contribution / previously The Moran Memorial Award: Presented to an individual(s) that judges consider to have made outstanding efforts towards the success and promotion of Britain in Bloom.
 No longer awarded: Best Inner City / Barratt Inner City Trophy: for the best effort in inner city areas
Young People's Award (from 2008) : Presented to the finalist deemed to involve young people from across the community in the best way.
School Award: Presented to the school within a finalist community that demonstrates the best commitment to on-going environmental and horticultural initiatives.
Environmental Responsibility(from 2012)  : Presented to the finalist that best demonstrated responsible management of resources within their entry.
RHS Britain in Bloom Heritage Award (from 2012) / previously Local Roots Award :Presented to the finalist that best demonstrated outstanding commitment to the ongoing care and development of their local heritage.

1971 to 1999

|-
! Horticulture !! Environment !! Community  !! Commercial !! Pride of Place !! Tourism !! Best Public Park  !! Conservation and Wildlife !! Outstanding Contribution !! Best Inner City !! Young People !! Heritage
|-
| style="background: #C0C0C0;"| || style="background: #C0C0C0;"| || style="background: #C0C0C0;"| || Bath || style="background: #C0C0C0;"| || style="background: #C0C0C0;"| || style="background: #C0C0C0;"| || style="background: #C0C0C0;"| || style="background: #C0C0C0;"| || style="background: #C0C0C0;"| ||  ||    
|-
| style="background: #C0C0C0;"| || style="background: #C0C0C0;"| || style="background: #C0C0C0;"| || Bath || style="background: #C0C0C0;"| || style="background: #C0C0C0;"| || style="background: #C0C0C0;"| || style="background: #C0C0C0;"| || style="background: #C0C0C0;"| || style="background: #C0C0C0;"| ||  ||    
|-
| style="background: #C0C0C0;"| || style="background: #C0C0C0;"| || style="background: #C0C0C0;"| || Bath || Bridlington || style="background: #C0C0C0;"| || style="background: #C0C0C0;"| || style="background: #C0C0C0;"| || style="background: #C0C0C0;"| || style="background: #C0C0C0;"| ||  ||    
|-
| style="background: #C0C0C0;"| || style="background: #C0C0C0;"| || style="background: #C0C0C0;"| || Bath || Clovelly || style="background: #C0C0C0;"| || style="background: #C0C0C0;"| || style="background: #C0C0C0;"| || style="background: #C0C0C0;"| || style="background: #C0C0C0;"| ||  ||    
|-
| style="background: #C0C0C0;"| ||style="background: #C0C0C0;"| || style="background: #C0C0C0;"| || City of London || London Borough of Camden || style="background: #C0C0C0;"| || style="background: #C0C0C0;"| || style="background: #C0C0C0;"| || style="background: #C0C0C0;"| || style="background: #C0C0C0;"| ||  ||    
|-
| style="background: #C0C0C0;"| || style="background: #C0C0C0;"| || style="background: #C0C0C0;"| || Bath || Wolviston || style="background: #C0C0C0;"| || style="background: #C0C0C0;"| || style="background: #C0C0C0;"| || Mr C B PreeceWest Country in Bloom || style="background: #C0C0C0;"| ||  ||    
|-
| style="background: #C0C0C0;"| || style="background: #C0C0C0;"| || style="background: #C0C0C0;"| || Bath || Exeter || style="background: #C0C0C0;"| || style="background: #C0C0C0;"| || style="background: #C0C0C0;"| || Mr P ConnEx Parks Director, City of Liverpool || style="background: #C0C0C0;"| ||  ||    
|-
| style="background: #C0C0C0;"| || style="background: #C0C0C0;"| || style="background: #C0C0C0;"| || Swansea || Holywell || style="background: #C0C0C0;"| || style="background: #C0C0C0;"| ||style="background: #C0C0C0;"| || Dr D W HuebnerChairman Yorkshire and Humberside in Bloom || style="background: #C0C0C0;"| ||  ||    
|-
| style="background: #C0C0C0;"| || Belfast || style="background: #C0C0C0;"| || York || Douglas || style="background: #C0C0C0;"| || style="background: #C0C0C0;"| || style="background: #C0C0C0;"| || Mr B WolleyChairman Northumberland in Bloom || style="background: #C0C0C0;"| ||  ||   
|-
| style="background: #C0C0C0;"| || Paisley || Belfast || Sidmouth || Forres || style="background: #C0C0C0;"| || style="background: #C0C0C0;"| || style="background: #C0C0C0;"| || style="background: #C0C0C0;"| || style="background: #C0C0C0;"| ||  ||   
|-
| style="background: #C0C0C0;"| || Stockport || Strathclyde || Bath || Largs || style="background: #C0C0C0;"| || style="background: #C0C0C0;"| || style="background: #C0C0C0;"| || Mr H ParkerAssistant Director of Environment (Parks) Swansea City Council || style="background: #C0C0C0;"| ||  ||   
|-
| Swansea || Kirkcaldy || Harold Peirce, Arthur Allen, Brian Pattenden, Nigel Rogers - Eastbourne Parks Dept || Stratford upon Avon || Stratford upon Avon || style="background: #C0C0C0;"| || style="background: #C0C0C0;"| || style="background: #C0C0C0;"| || (posthumous)Bob Hare || style="background: #C0C0C0;"| ||  ||   
|-
| Ryton || Aberdeen || Tevrnspite, Dyfed || Sidmouth || Cheltenham || style="background: #C0C0C0;"| || style="background: #C0C0C0;"| || style="background: #C0C0C0;"| || David WelchDirector of Leisure and Recreation, Aberdeen || style="background: #C0C0C0;"| ||  ||    
|-
| Cheltenham || Forres || St. David's Centre, Cardiff || Nantwich || East Sleekburn || style="background: #C0C0C0;"| || style="background: #C0C0C0;"| || style="background: #C0C0C0;"| || George DickVillage orderly of Ballinamallard || style="background: #C0C0C0;"| ||  ||    
|-
| Douglas || Crewe || Tom Dobbins, Babbacombe Model Village, Devon || Torquay || Market Bosworth || style="background: #C0C0C0;"| || style="background: #C0C0C0;"| || style="background: #C0C0C0;"| || Dr W DallyEdzell || style="background: #C0C0C0;"| || ||    
|-
| Shrewsbury || Belfast || Walter Dinning, Parks Department, Gateshead || Nantwich || Sorn || style="background: #C0C0C0;"| || style="background: #C0C0C0;"| || style="background: #C0C0C0;"|  || Leonard Likorishformer Director General of the British Tourist Authority || style="background: #C0C0C0;"| ||  ||     
|-
| Bath || Crewe || The Japanese Garden, Aberdeen || Stratford upon Avon || Bury St Edmunds || style="background: #C0C0C0;"| || style="background: #C0C0C0;"| || style="background: #C0C0C0;"| || Jim WoodsKillyleagh || style="background: #C0C0C0;"| ||  ||    
|-
| Bury St Edmunds || Plymouth || Moffat || Gorey, Jersey || Exeter || style="background: #C0C0C0;"| || style="background: #C0C0C0;"| || style="background: #C0C0C0;"| || Lewis McAvoyChief Technical Officer Lisburn Borough Council || Oxford ||  ||   
|-
| Morpeth || Telford || Saintfield in Bloom Committee || Bournemouth || Moira || style="background: #C0C0C0;"| || style="background: #C0C0C0;"| || style="background: #C0C0C0;"| || Muriel PreeceOrganiser of West Country in Bloom || Leeds ||  ||   
|-
| Southport || Swansea || Guildford || J Sainsbury plc || Nuneaton and Bedworth || Keswick || style="background: #C0C0C0;"| || style="background: #C0C0C0;"| || George TomlinsonCrewe || Plymouth ||  ||    
|-
| Bath ||  ||  || ||  ||  ||  ||  ||  ||  ||  ||   
|-
|  ||  ||  ||  ||  ||  ||  ||  ||  || Nottingham ||  ||    
|-
|  ||  ||  ||  ||  ||  ||  |||  ||  || Nottingham, Hyson Green ||  ||    
|-

2000 to 2009

|-
! Horticulture !! Environment  !! Community !! Commercial!! Pride of Place!! Tourism!! Best Public Park !! Conservation and Wildlife!! Outstanding Contribution!! Best Inner City!! Young People!! Heritage
|-
|  || ||  ||  ||  ||  ||  ||  ||  || Portsmouth ||  || 
|-
| Bath || St. Helier - Harbour Approach ||  || KeyMed, Southend on Sea ||wcastle upon Tyne]] || Lynton & Lynmouth || The Crichton Dumfries || Tatsfield || Pupils and teachers at Applegrove Primary School, Forres || Leeds ||| style="background: #C0C0C0;"| ||
|-
| Stafford || Oxford - Arlington Business Park || Saltburn by the Sea || Doxford International Business Park, Sunderland  || Newcastle-under-Lyme - Meadows Residents Association || Drumnadrochit & Brighton and Hove || Johnston Park Aberdeen || London Borough of Bromley || Carolyn Wilson, Alness || style="background: #C0C0C0;"| ||  || 
|-
| Falkland || Guildford || Coleraine || Normanton || Aberdeen || Barnstaple || Botanic Gardens Bath  || Bury St. Edmunds || Malcolm Wood, Nottingham || style="background: #C0C0C0;"| ||  || 
|-
| Perth || Sheffield - Peace Garden || Seedley and Langworthy (Salford) || Bracknell Flowers, Bracknell || Market Bosworth || Falkland || Jephson Gardens Royal Leamington Spa || Tilgate Centre, Crawley || Doug Stacey || style="background: #C0C0C0;"| ||  ||  Sheffield and Market Harborough
|-
| Nottingham || North Berwick || The Friends of Norwich in Bloom || Fareham Memorial Gardens || Manchester City Centre || Hexham || University Park Nottingham  || Rottingdean || Jeanette Warke, Londonderry || style="background: #C0C0C0;"| ||  || 
|-
| Shrewsbury || St. Helier - Waterfront || Falkland || Taylors of Harrogate, Starbeck  || Norton in Hales || Scarborough || Greyfriars Green Coventry || Durlston Country Park, Swanage || Clifford Prout, Old Colwyn || style="background: #C0C0C0;"| ||  || 
|-
| Grouville || Bury St. Edmunds and Abbots Green School || Nottingham || White Rose shopping centre, Beeston || Duffus and North Berwick || Cleethorpes || Mount Edgcumbe Park Plymouth || Cardiff Bay || Christel MacIntosh, Alness || style="background: #C0C0C0;"| ||  || 
|-
| Perth || Sheffield || Cricklade || Ocean Road, South Shields || Sheffield || Douglas, Isle of Man || Ravelin Park Southsea || North Meadow, Cricklade || Terry Bane || style="background: #C0C0C0;"| || Applegrove School, Forres ||
|-
| Rustington || Bangor - Bangor Walled Garden || Earsdon || St. Brelade's Bay Hotel || St Andrew's, Scotland || Chipping, Lancashire || Harrogate - Valley Gardens || Farthing Downs and New Hill, London Borough of Croydon || Vic Verrier || style="background: #C0C0C0;"| || Falkland, Fife|Falkland || Eston, North Yorkshire and Plymouth
|-

2010 to 2016

|-
! Horticulture !! Environment !! Community !! Commercial !! Pride of Place !! Tourism !! Best Public Park !! Conservation and Wildlife !! Outstanding Contribution!! Young People !! School !! Heritage !! Environmental Responsibility
|-
| Coleraine || City of London || Crawley || Beighton, Sheffield || Tameside || Harrogate || Bristol Zoo || Solihull || Ken Powles and Susan Smith || Douglas, Isle of Man || Portchester Northern Community School, Fareham || Halstead || style="background: #C0C0C0;"|
|-
| Bury || University of Edinburgh - Pollock Campus || Chirk (Wrexham) || Graythwaite Manor Hotel, Grange over Sands || Derry City, Ulster || Tenby, Wales || Royal Botanic Gardens, Edinburgh || Avon Gorge & Downs, Bristol || Jim Knight || Wee FIBbees, Forres, Scotland || Spring Common School, Moor (Huntingdon) || style="background: #C0C0C0;"| || style="background: #C0C0C0;"|
|-
| Birmingham || St Helier, Jersey || Loughborough || Hendra Caravan Park, Newquay || Oldham || Joint winners: Herm, Guernsey; and Great Yarmouth || Cannon Hill Park, Birmingham || Kippax (Leeds) || John Woodward and Clive Addison || Joint winners: St George's Crypt, Leeds; and Stone, Staffordshire || St Bede's Catholic High School, Lytham || Chirk (Wrexham) || Thornbury Community Composting Site, Thornbury
|-
| Glenrothes || Diamond Jubilee Gardens, London Borough of Richmond upon Thames || Biddulph, Coupar Angus, Edinburgh, Hunmanby, Prestatyn, Stanghow and Starbeck || Sanderson Arcade and Bus Station, Morpeth || Stockton-on-Tees || Bournemouth || The Dingle, Shrewsbury || Saint Brélade || Alan Heath, Cumbria, Maurice Baren, Yorkshire and Patsy Clark MBE, Northumbria || Dartmouth, Morpeth and Prestatyn ||| Oakley School, Tunbridge Wells || Eston (Middlesbrough) || Bury
|-
| Oldham || London Bridge || Truro || Stockley Park, Hillingdon || Port Marine & Village Quarter (Portishead) || Shrewsbury || Roundhay Park, Leeds || Tresco || Walter Dinning and Mark Wasilewski MVO || Immingham || Joint winners: St Mary's School, Dalton with Newton, and Edith Cavell Academy and Nursery School, Norwich  || Pitlochry || style="background: #C0C0C0;"|
|-

Regions
There are 18 Regions/ Nations "in Bloom", each of which coordinate regional campaigns in their area. The regions of the UK and Crown dependencies used in the competition are (with reference to ceremonial counties and government office regions):

RHS It's Your Neighbourhood

RHS It's Your Neighbourhood is part of the wider RHS Britain in Bloom initiative, helping volunteer-led groups to improve their local area. Any group can take part, as long as it is volunteer-led and involved in hands-on community gardening. It should also be working with the community for the benefit of the community. Participating groups care for all sorts of spaces - from local parks and gardens, to odd grot-spots which have been transformed and shared residential spaces or alleyways.

The campaign was launched by the RHS in 2006 to support grassroots community gardening and there are currently more than 1,300 registered groups. (2012)

The initiative works around the same three pillars of assessment as RHS Britain in Bloom: Community Participation, Gardening Achievement and Environmental Responsibility; however, it is not a competitive campaign. Participating groups receive an annual visit from an It's Your Neighbourhood assessor, who provides feedback and tips for how to develop projects, and each group receives a certificate of achievement from the RHS.

It's Your Neighbourhood is free to enter and open to groups of all sizes.

Source of civic pride

Winning a category within Britain in Bloom at a national or even regional level has proved to be a source of considerable civic pride for the towns, cities and villages involved. Many of the authorities of the winning locations do advertise their achievements on signs within, or more predominantly on the outskirts of their settlement. One journalist stated that "Since Britain In Bloom began in 1963 … nothing has pleased town councillors more than to hammer up a sign at the outskirts of their kingdom trumpeting superiority to incoming visitors… Few events provide a sterner test of civic pride." Examples include Garstang where the sign that leads to the high street at the heart of the town says, above the name "Garstang", Britain In Bloom Small Town – Gold Award Winners 2002, 2005, and "Invitation Finalists to Champion of Champions 2006", or Guildford, which advertises its past triumph in the Town category on its welcome signs.

Further reading
Graham Ashworth, CBE, Britain in Bloom, The Tidy Britain Group (Wigan:1991)
RHS Growing Communities magazine

References and notes

External links
Britain in Bloom
It's Your Neighbourhood
 RHS Growing Communities magazine

Other language Wikipedias
Concours des villes et villages fleuris - French National Competition article
Entente Florale Deutschland - German National Competition article

Royal Horticultural Society
Gardening in the United Kingdom
Horticultural competitions
Competitions in the United Kingdom
British awards
1963 establishments in the United Kingdom
Recurring events established in 1963
Annual events in the United Kingdom